Pseudomeritastis clarkei is a species of moth of the family Tortricidae. It is found in Colombia.

The length of the forewings is about 9 mm. The forewings are light grey with brown-ferruginous markings, edged and in part transversely strigulated (finely streaked) with reddish fuscous. The hindwings are pale yellowish, slightly darker externally and cream white basally.

Etymology
The species is named for its discoverer, Dr. J. F. Gates Clarke.

References

Moths described in 1966
Euliini